Suttersville, California may refer to:
Sutter Creek, California
Sutterville, California